Amberley, Gloucestershire is a small village about two miles south of Stroud in Gloucestershire, England. It is situated on the edge of Minchinhampton Common, known for its Golf Club and course.

Places of interest
 War memorial to the soldiers who died in World War II
 Holy Trinity Church, Amberley. The author P C Wren, who wrote Beau Geste, is buried in the churchyard, as is Sir Fabian Ware, founder of the Imperial War Graves Commission.
 The Black Horse Pub
 The Amberley Inn Hotel
 Amberley Parochial School

References

External links
Amberley website, including history, news, local information, and many photographs
 Stroud Voices (Amberley filter) - oral history site

Villages in Gloucestershire
Stroud District